Siddha Cave or Siddha Gufa is a cave located in Bimalnagar, Tanahun District, Nepal. It's around 0.5 kilometer inside and around 2,500 people can fit inside. If you would like to go over Siddha Cave then you have to take vehicle from Kathmandu on Prithvi Highway which will take around 4 hours to Bimalnagar, then you have to walk up hills on steps. It will take around half to 1 hour [Depends on how fast you’ll walk] from main highway Bimalnagar to reach to Cave.

This cave has lot of mysteries.

See also
List of caves in Nepal

References 

Caves of Nepal